Tung Wah Group of Hospitals S. C. Gaw Memorial College is a secondary school on Tsing Yi Island, Hong Kong. The school is surrounded by four resited villages, Tai Wong Ha, Yim Tin Kok, Lam Tin, and San Uk.

The College is a co-educational school, accepting both boys and girls. The majority of students are residents on the island though there are many students from other parts of Hong Kong. Established by the Tung Wah Group of Hospitals, a registered charity, in 1984, the school is dependent upon government funding. Instruction is given in English, Cantonese (oral) and Chinese (written).

History
In the early 1980s, as part of the major new town development in the area, the Ha Chung Mei village area close to Tsing Yi Lagoon was reclaimed by the government. As part of a government drive to build more classrooms, the college was established in 1984 by the charity organisation Tung Wah Group of Hospitals. It was the third secondary school to be built on Tsing Yi Island and the 13th secondary school of the charity. S. C. Gaw was the father of a former Tung Wah director, Anthony T. Gaw.

Due to construction delays, it commenced classes in 1984 in 12 borrowed classrooms at nearby Po Leung Kuk 1983 Board of Directors' College. The school moved into its new building in March 1984 and a formal opening ceremony was held in January 1986, the next year, presided over by senior government official  Poon-wai.

In 2005, an extension of the school was completed.

In 2015, Latin dancers of the college were awarded prizes at the 90th Blackpool Dance Festival.

Motto & colours

School motto
The school motto, (literally "diligence, frugality, loyalty, belief"), is inscribed on a lacquered board in its assembly hall. School houses are named for each of the components of the motto.

House and school colours
The school divides students and teaching staff into four houses. Houses are named after the school motto, namely, Diligence, Frugality, Loyalty, and Belief. Diligence is in red, Frugality orange, Loyalty yellow and Belief blue.

Principals
Cheng Man-wai 1984 - 1997
Tam Fuk-kei 1997 - 2005
Ho Lai-po 2005 - 2010
Agnes Tang Wai-chun 2010–2017
Jack Wong 2018–Present

See also
Primary schools of Tung Wah Group of Hospitals in Tsing Yi

Website

References

External links

Educational institutions established in 1984
S
S
Secondary schools in Hong Kong
Tsing Yi
1984 establishments in Hong Kong